Freston is a small village and civil parish in the Babergh district, in the county of Suffolk, England, located on the Shotley Peninsula, 4 miles south-east of Ipswich. In 2001 the parish had a population of 122, reducing slightly to 120 at the 2011 Census.

History

Bubonic plague

Freston is notable as the location of the last outbreak of bubonic plague in England in 1910.  The centre of the outbreak was Latimer Cottages, where it is thought plague-bearing rats may have come ashore with smuggled goods. However, the diagnosis of plague has been disputed.

Amenities and places of interest
 St. Peter's Church
 The Freston Boot public house, which closed in 2010 and reopened in 2018
 Freston Wood
 Freston Tower, either a lookout tower or a folly

Transport
For transport there is the B1456 road nearby.

Notable residents
William Latymer (1499–1583), evangelical clergyman, Dean of Peterborough from 1560. He was chaplain to Anne Boleyn
Isaac Eastey (1627-1712), husband of Mary Eastey, who was executed during the Salem Witch Trials
Clara Reeve (1729-1807), novelist best known for the Gothic novel The Old English Baron
Foster Barham Zincke (1817-1893),  clergyman, a traveller, and an antiquary

References

External links

Villages in Suffolk
Civil parishes in Suffolk
Babergh District